The 2019 NCAA Division I women's volleyball tournament began on December 6, 2019 and concluded on December 21 at the PPG Paints Arena in Pittsburgh, Pennsylvania. The tournament field was announced on December 1, 2019. Stanford beat Wisconsin in the final to claim their ninth national championship.

Qualifying Teams
Sources

Bracket

Baylor Regional

Schedule

First round

Second round

Regional semifinals

Regional final

Wisconsin Regional

Schedule

First round

Second round

Regional semifinals

Regional final

Stanford Regional

Schedule

First round

Second round

Regional semifinals

Regional final

Texas Regional

Schedule

First round

Second round

Regional semifinals

Regional final

Final four

National semifinals

National Championship

Final Four All-Tournament Team

Kathryn Plummer – Stanford (Most Outstanding Player)
Morgan Hentz – Stanford
Jenna Gray – Stanford
Dana Rettke – Wisconsin
Molly Haggerty – Wisconsin
Yossiana Pressley – Baylor
Alexis Hart – Minnesota

Media Coverage
First and second round matches will be streamed or televised by local school RSN's or streaming services. The 3rd round to the finals will all be streamed by WatchESPN or televised by ESPN Networks.

First & Second Rounds
Spencer Linton & Amy Gant – Provo, Utah (BYUtv)
Regional semifinals & Regional Finals
Paul Sunderland & Karch Kiraly– Madison, Wisconsin
Sam Gore & Kate George – Waco, Texas
National semifinals
Paul Sunderland, Karch Kiraly, & Holly Rowe – Pittsburgh, Pennsylvania

First & Second Rounds
Paul Sunderland, Karch Kiraly, & Holly Rowe – Austin, Texas (LHN)
Regional semifinals & Regional Finals
Courtney Lyle & Salima Rockwell – Austin, Texas
Tiffany Greene & Missy Whittemore – Stanford, California
National Championship
Paul Sunderland, Karch Kiraly, & Holly Rowe – Pittsburgh, Pennsylvania

NCAA tournament record

There is one NCAA tournament record that was set in the 2019 tournament:

Hitting percentage, tournament (individual record, minimum 75 attempts) — Madeleine Gates, Stanford University — .563%  (5—0/12 vs. Denver, 7—0/11 vs. Cal Poly, 8—0/14 vs. Utah, 11—0/15 vs. Penn State, 5—0/11 vs. Minnesota, 10—1/17 vs. Wisconsin.)

References

 
December 2019 sports events in the United States
NCAA
NCAA Women's Volleyball Championship
Sports competitions in Pittsburgh